About

India has had a rich heritage of art and music since ancient times. Different states have held the tradition even till date, and Rajasthan is one among them. Jaipur Tamasha, a unique musical folk play, is a 19th-century contribution by Jaipur city in Indian state of Rajasthan to the folk theatre of Rajasthan. At the outset of the 18th century, in the peripherals of Agra, between two groups originated and developed a poetic dialogue. This later on came to be known as ‘Khayal-Tamasha’ during the reign of Aurangzeb, When musicians lost their patronage, they started looking for alternative environments to carry out their art and music. the contemporary emperor of Jaipur, Maharaja Sawai Jaisingh brought a few artists to Jaipur and settled them in Brahmpuri. The foremost among them was the Bhatt Family of Jaipur. Here in under the proximity of the chief of the Bhatt family, Shri Banshidhar Bhatt, Tamasha style developed a specific form. This was a musical based folk dramatic form, which had an explicit composition of music acting and dance. 

The Tamasha form with its music comprising classical, semi classical and folk melody, replete with acting and dancing is being performed from the last 250 years in the open theatre called ‘Akhara’ at Brahampuri in Jaipur with a unique style of presentation. It is performed mainly on the day's surrounding the festival Holi, on the days of Holi on the following Amaveasya and on Ramnavmi. Similar to the ‘Aagan Theatre’ The entire performance takes place under the open air and the audience sits in a circle with the stage in the middle. the Tamasha actors perform in the center with the singers, performers and musicians accompanied by their instruments.  the Tamasha begins with a ‘Lahariya’ there begins a special dancing performance upon a contemporary rhythm which moves from show to fast and reaches its perfection.

The foundation of the narrative of Tamasha is solidarity, love and religious co-existence (secularism) as the Sanskrit plays conclude with a ‘Bharat Vakya’ Tamasha too, at the end of its plot concludes with a happy ending, the fulfilling of the wishes of the protagonist and wishing for the welfare of all. In the Tamasha, the main ragas which are used are ‘Bhupali’ 'Sarang' ‘Aasawari’ (Komal ishbh) "Jonpuri’ ‘Malkauns’ ‘Darbari’ ‘Bihag’ ‘Sindh Kafi’ ‘ Bhairvi’ ‘Kalingda’ and ‘Kedar’ etc. The accompanying instruments are Harmoniyam, Tabla, Sarangi, and Ghugroo.

The costumes are very important to the identity of Tamasha. The Tamasha (Crest) "kalangi’ (plume) Gotedar Bhagwavastra ( laced saffron garments), a singi and seli (a sheat fish and a neck ornament) to give beats are among the chief costumes of the performance of Tamasha.. The Tamasha actors also give an imagined description of the costumes of the performance to which the audience believes similarly the part of the female characters is and the audience enjoys suspending their disbelief. The creative texts used in tamasha are chiefly ‘Tamasha Gopichand’ ‘ Tamasha Ranjah heer’ ‘Tamasha Jogi Jogan’ ‘Roopchand Gandhi’  ‘ Jutthan Miyan’ ‘Chaila Panihari’, etc. The Jaipur Tamasha has become very famous folk tradition in North India.

This folk art originally took place as poetic dialogues between two groups of poets. These poets received special attention in the royal court of Maharaja Sawai Jai Singh. Bhatt family was one of the lucky poetic family that received acknowledgment for the art. Under this clan, the poetic expressions developed into several new and distinct forms of art. Even today poetry is one of the main forms of Tamasha. However, it now greatly accompanies by singing, acting, and dancing. Since then the Tamasha folk art of Jaipur has become popular, and it continues to attract tourists even till date. The musical tamasha has managed to survive and entertain audiences even in the modern world.

Even though the art form has existed for more than 250 years with the core elements remaining the same, it has received some influence from the contemporary world, as well. This mainly reflects in the storyline and there are even references of actual events of the present times. It might include anything from recent scandals in politics to developments in sports or technology. Therefore, this form of art is still popular, and they are used in movies and theatres, as well.

Key Performers and Artists

From its Beginning to year 2020
  
1. late Sh Banshidhar Bhatt 'Danishiromani' (founder of Tamasha) 
2. late Brijpal Bhatt
3. late Phool ji Bhatt
4  late Mannu Lal Bhatt
5. late Gopikrishna Bhatt
6. late Govind Narayan Bhatt
7. late Damodar Lal Bhatt
8. Jagdish Prasad Bhatt
9. Late Niranjan Bhatt

New Generation Performers

1. Tapan Bhatt
2. Dilip Bhatt
3. Dr Saurabh Bhatt
4. Vishal Bhatt
5. Vinat Bhatt
6. Gopesh Bhatt
7. Shailendra Sharma
8. Samwad Bhatt

References 

"Jaipur Tamasha" by Vasudev Bhatt,
"Jaipur tamasha shaili ka parivartit swaroop,parampara evm parivartan ke sandarbh mein" by - saurabh bhatt
"Rajasthan ki Sanskritic Prasthbhoomi",
"Jaipur ki Lok Natya Parampara "sangeet ke paripekhshya mein" by Bindu Rana

Culture of Jaipur
Indian plays